Chinese Weiqi Association, or Chinese Go Association, founded in Hefei, Anhui in 1962, is the major go organization in China.  As a branch of the Zhongguo Qiyuan, it oversees professional players as well as strong amateurs, functioning in the same way as the Nihon Kiin and other such groups.

Chinese Weiqi Association became a member of the International Go Federation in 1982.

List of chairmen
Li Menghua (李梦华): 1962–1988
Chen Zude (陈祖德): 1988–2006
Wang Runan (王汝南): 2006–2017
Lin Jianchao (林建超): 29 December 2017–present

References

Go organizations
Sports organizations established in 1962
Weiqi